The Noor Mahal is a Pakistan Army-owned palace in Bahawalpur, Punjab, Pakistan. It was built in 1872 like an Italian chateau on neoclassical lines, at a time when modernism had set in. It belonged to the Nawabs of Bahawalpur princely state, during British Raj.

History

There are various stories regarding its construction. According to the sources Nawab Sir Sadiq Abbasi 4 built the Palace  for himself.

Noor Mehal is one of the hidden gems of Bahawalpur, due to the lack of publicity. The palace is open to public. It is currently in the possession of the Pakistan Army and is used as a state guest house for holding state durbars and meetings with foreign delegations.

Architecture

Mr. Heennan, an Englishman who was the state engineer, designed the building. The foundation of Noor Palace was laid in 1872. A map and coins of the state were buried in its foundation as a good omen. Most of the palace's materials and furniture were imported from England and Italy. The construction of the palace was completed in 1875 at a cost of Rs. 1.2 million. Considering the amount of silver in the Indian Rupee Coin at 11.66 Grams in 1862, this amount in 2016 would come to about 8.1 million US dollars. It has 32 rooms including 14 in the basement, 6 verandas and 5 domes.

The design encompasses features of Corinthian and Islamic styles of architecture with a tinge of subcontinental style. The Corinthian touch is visible in the columns, balustrade, pediments and the vaulted ceiling of Durbar Hall. The Islamic style is evident in the five domes, whereas the angular elliptical shapes are a stroke of subcontinent style. Nawab Muhammad Bahawal Khan the fifth added a mosque to the palace in 1906 at the cost of Rs. 20,000. The design is based on the mosque of Aitchison College.

In 1956, when Bahawalpur State was merged into Pakistan, the building was taken over by the Auqaf department. The palace was leased to the army in 1971; in 1997 the army purchased it for the sum of 119 million.

The building was declared a “protected monument” in September 2001 by the Government of Pakistan's Department of Archeology, and it is now open for general visitors, students trips and other interested persons.

Things to see
There are a lot of artefacts in the palace. It includes many objects used by the Nawabs - swords, currency notes and coins, legal documents, furniture, and a piano. There is also a long wall in it that contains photos of Nawabs. Only one picture is real, all others are imaginary. There is also a prison cell aside the palace.

Gallery

See also

List of UNESCO World Heritage Sites in Pakistan
List of forts in Pakistan
List of museums in Pakistan
 Bahawalpur
 Bahawalpur State
 Bahawalpur State History

References

External links
 Noor Mahal Bahawalpur - information and pictures
 When Noor Mahal was Built?

Palaces in Pakistan
Buildings and structures in Bahawalpur
Royal residences in Pakistan
Houses completed in 1872
Indo-Saracenic Revival architecture
Tourist attractions in Bahawalpur
Pakistan Army